The JetBlue flight attendant incident occurred after JetBlue Airways Flight 1052, from Pittsburgh to New York City on August 9, 2010, had landed at John F. Kennedy International Airport. Steven Slater, a veteran flight attendant announced over the plane's public address system that he had been abused by a passenger and was quitting his job. He then grabbed and guzzled two beers and exited the plane by deploying the evacuation slide and sliding down it. Slater claimed to have been injured by a passenger when he instructed her to sit down. His account of the event was not corroborated by others who claimed he hip-checked the woman.

Incident 
Slater claimed that as JetBlue Flight 1052 taxied to a stop, a passenger stood up too early to retrieve her bag from the overhead compartment. She had been instructed repeatedly to remain seated. Despite this, the passenger continued to remove the bag, and in doing so, she hit Slater in the head with the bag. When asked for an apology, the passenger responded with profanity. Port Authority Police concluded Slater's initial account of a confrontation was fabricated. As early as August 13, investigators stated none of the dozens of passengers interviewed about the incident had corroborated his account.

A passenger reported that Slater went on the plane's public address system and used his own profanities. He stated "I've been in this business 20 years. And that's it, I'm done." He then activated the emergency inflatable slide, exited the plane, and threw his tie on the tarmac before calmly walking to his Jeep.

Later that day, Slater was arrested and charged with criminal mischief, reckless endangerment, and criminal trespass, to which he pleaded not guilty.

The district attorney pursuing the case said Slater's actions were serious and could have killed or grievously injured anyone below the inflatable plastic chute. The Federal Aviation Administration, which certifies flight attendants, also investigated the incident.  "Clearly, you're not supposed to pop the slides unless there's an emergency in the aircraft", said FAA spokesman Les Dorr. "We're continuing to investigate circumstances as well as any violations that may have occurred."

Reversing his original declaration ("I'm done."), Slater indicated that he had not resigned, and sought to continue his employment by JetBlue.  On August 12, he announced through his attorney that he would seek to return. At some point prior to September 5, Slater formally resigned from JetBlue, although it is disputed if he was terminated by JetBlue prior to this.

Slater's account of the events 
Slater's attorney has said that at the beginning of the flight, two female passengers had argued over the allocated bag space in the overhead bin. Once the plane landed, the dispute flared again when one of the women was told that a bag she had checked at the gate would not be immediately available. She then began to curse at Slater.  According to a Port Authority police officer quoted by the Wall Street Journal, no passenger or other crew member has corroborated Slater's account of a confrontation with a passenger.

Investigators believed that Slater was intoxicated and suffering from mental problems. A later mental health evaluation found that he had a clinical disorder as well as substance-abuse and alcohol-abuse problems.

Third-party reactions 
Aviation experts and officials said that the Slater incident exposes gaps in the aviation security system that could be exploited by someone seeking to cause real harm. For instance, after deplaning, Slater was able to run through secure zones near planes while towing two carry-on bags. Some Port Authority police officials have criticized JetBlue for waiting 25 minutes before informing them of the incident. Some of the delay may be attributed to the fact that police radios do not work inside JetBlue's terminal. The Port Authority also criticized JetBlue for refusing to give them its flight manifest or videos of the incident. JetBlue has since handed over the flight manifest, but not the videos.

Bill Briggs of MSNBC said that the incident "launched a fresh examination of the two-faced persona all flight attendants are asked to master: grinning snack server one moment, frowning rules enforcer the next."  Corey Caldwell, a spokesperson for the Association of Flight Attendants, said that while the association did not condone Slater's behavior, it held concerns for flight attendants working longer hours for lower wages and for passengers carrying heavier bags due to fees on checked luggage. Sarah Keagle, a flight attendant who writes in the blog The Flying Pinto, said "Hopefully," the incident "was an 'Aha' moment for the traveling public." Keagle argued that while flight attendants like dealing with most passengers, a few disruptive passengers make the job difficult. Kathy Sweeney, a flight attendant who worked for America West Airlines, said in an AOL Original article that "While I don't agree with Steven Slater endangering passengers by 'blowing a slide' (let alone forcing JetBlue to pay about $10k to repack the slide), I can see how he snapped."

Rich Lowry wrote that the incident represents "the value our culture puts on emotional expressiveness" drawing parallels between Captain Chesley Sullenberger's "unadorned professionalism" when he landed US Airways Flight 1549 in the Hudson River with no deaths, and Slater's "tantrum" which escalated into "an act of reckless endangerment".

Froma Harrop said in her syndicated column that if there had been an unruly passenger, Slater should not have abandoned his fellow flight crew. She says that even if his story is true, he was just an angry person acting out and not a case of "a working-class hero".

Retired airline pilot Arthur G. Schoppaul has said that Slater's actions cost the airline a lot of money; these expenses would have included not only the cost of replacing the deployed chute and the costs associated with delayed passengers, but also costs associated with the disrupted utilization of the airplane down the line. He also doubted that passengers and crew would feel safe flying with a crew member "who is subject to an act of hysteria". It has been claimed that as a result of his action other flights might have been affected.

JetBlue's response 
JetBlue first discussed the incident with a post on JetBlue's blog, BlueTales. In a memo to employees, they have said that, "If Mr. Slater's story proves to be accurate, and even if there was a precipitating event that motivated his behavior, that still doesn't excuse his actions." The memo stated, "Let me just say this: JetBlue will always seek to prosecute people who physically harm or threaten to harm a crew member or customer. Period." In their view the most "distressing aspect" of the coverage was that press reports did not take the chute deployment seriously enough. "Slides deploy extremely quickly, with enough force to kill a person", the memo read. "Slides can be as dangerous as a gun." The memo further stated that "It is an insult to all aviation professionals to have this particular element of the story treated without the seriousness it deserves."

The memo also explained the apparent 25-minute delay in informing the police of the incident: "It isn't our policy to call police on a slide deployment; our policy is to treat the event as an emergency and implement our emergency response plan. The moment we confirmed the safety of the Customers and Crew—both on board and on the ground—it became a matter for the police."

JetBlue suspended Slater and initially refused to comment on his future with the company. Later, the company indicated that Slater was no longer among its employees.

JetBlue CEO David Barger has said of Slater, "[He] is not a hero in my book", Barger called Slater's actions "an egregious act" that defied safety. He also said that the incident was costly to the airline, as it delayed other JetBlue flights and the plane had to be taken out of service for "a couple of hours". He added that his own flight had been delayed and said that he was "disheartened to think that so many people would call him [Slater] a hero."
In an interview with SunSentinel.com Dave Barger said that Slater's actions reflected poorly on Slater, and that his actions did not represent the values and practices of the company. Barger went on to describe Slater as a coward. Slater was also criticized for throwing his tie onto the tarmac since it could have blown into the path of a taxiing plane and been sucked into an engine.

Timeline 
August 9
10:35 am – Scheduled departure from Pittsburgh International Airport
11:59 am – Scheduled arrival at JFK. According to Slater, he gets into an argument with a passenger over a package. Slater tells the passengers to "go fuck yourselves," grabs two Blue Moon beers, guzzles them down and deploys the escape chute, slides down and then drives home from his car parked at the airport.
12:07 pm – L-1 door is opened without incident and customers begin deplaning
12:12 pm – the flight crew reported that the slide was deployed. Three minutes later the crew reported that the deployment was intentional and asked that corporate security be notified
12:29 pm or 12:34 pm – JetBlue reports the incident to police.
1:30 pm – Slater arrested at his home in Belle Harbor, Queens. Police tracked him down at his home where he was apparently engaging in sex. Slater is initially belligerent with police, but is persuaded to go peacefully.   At his arraignment he fails to post bail of $2,500 and is removed to the Vernon C. Bain Correctional Center, a South Bronx jail on a floating barge.
August 10
Incident on front page of New York tabloids with New York Post proclaiming "Freakin' Flier" and New York Daily News proclaiming "Planely Nuts".
Slater, with a court-appointed attorney, posts $2,500 bail and is released from custody.
Next Media Animation in Taiwan produces animation of the event.
August 11 – USA Today proclaims, "JetBlue flight attendant strikes a nerve with stressed workers".
Wall Street Journal/NBC poll suggests the event reflect broad public anger. Peggy Noonan writes in the Wall Street Journal that the event has struck a chord. She says "Once we were a great industrial nation. Now we are a service economy. Which means we are forced to interact with each other, every day, in person and by phone and email. And it's making us all a little mad."
August 14 – Stone Stanley Entertainment reported to have offered Slater a reality show.
August 15 – New York Times and Washington Post proclaim that Slater has become a folk hero in some quarters.
August 16 – New York Post reports that investigators are "definitely leaning toward" a conclusion that Slater's claims about being assaulted by a passenger are lies.
August 17 – Slater hires publicist Howard Bragman.
August 18 – Republican National Committee evokes Slater in television advertisement depicting Democrats abandoning Air Force One via a chute after a Barack Obama speech on the public address system.
August 19 – Forbes publishes article headlined, "How To Head Off The Steven Slater In Your Organization."
August 22 – The New York Times points out that the incident shows that being a flight attendant is no longer glamorous.
August 23
Angus Reid Global Monitor publishes poll that says 52 percent of flying Americans had followed the case "very closely" or "moderately closely" with 25% believing Slater's actions were justified and 32% believing they were unjustified.
Heather Robinson, a former writer for the New York Daily News, who was on the flight publishes an article headlined "From a Passenger on Jet Blue Flight 1052: Why Steven Slater Has Gone From Working Class Hero to Public Enemy Number One" on the Huffington Post questioning why the police have not contacted her. She says she was one of the first people on the plane and reports that Slater was not rude at the start of the flight and that she did not notice any injury to Slater. She speculates that the incident may have occurred early in the boarding before many of the passengers boarded. She also stated that she herself had not witnessed the incident.
September 1 – Slater resigns as a JetBlue employee.
September 4 – JetBlue announces that Slater is no longer employed by the airline.
September 7 – Slater appears in Queens Criminal Court.  His attorney and the prosecutor agreed to an adjournment until October 19.  District Attorney Richard Brown stated that Slater will undergo mental health evaluation and if admitted for an alternative sentencing program it would mean attending a treatment program that could allow Slater to avoid imprisonment.
November 2010 – Slater is recruited by Toktumi for their MileHighText Club.

Aftermath 
Slater agreed to a plea bargain in October 2010 in which he would plead guilty to one of the lesser charges, accept a status of probation, receive drug testing, undergo counseling, and avoid prison. He would also pay JetBlue $10,000 for restitution. On October 19, 2011, Slater withdrew his guilty plea to a felony charge of attempted second-degree criminal mischief and would serve a year of probation on a misdemeanor charge of attempted fourth-degree criminal mischief. He also appeared in a taped message at the Rally to Restore Sanity and/or Fear, apologizing for his actions.

Slater also later blamed his actions on stress related to HIV-related health problems, as well as his terminally ill mother's health issues. In 2017 he likened the whole occurrence to an out-of-body experience: "In some respects, it was like, 'Oh my God, I'm doing this.' And then the next thing I know, I was on the tarmac", he recalled to The Washington Post. "I remember standing on the tarmac on the sun and it was just so warm. I thought, 'Ahh, I can exhale. But how did this happen?

Since completing community service, Slater has moved to Los Angeles and kept a low public profile. "It's a before and after. My life was completely transformed, for better or for worse, after that date," he recalled. "I mean, it wasn't the smartest thing I've ever done but it sure felt great ... I just hit like a crescendo of frustration." He has since been able to recover from his drug and alcohol addictions. Despite some job interviews, he has had difficulty getting hired because of his history, which he does not hold against prospective employers. "If I'm going in for some sort of a customer service position, I'm kind of like your worst nightmare."

Slater told the newspaper he had nevertheless been doing some work with disabled people. The Post was occasioned to speak with him after a Twitter employee leaving the company briefly deactivated Donald Trump's account, an action compared on social media to his departure from JetBlue. He advised that person to prepare for the backlash but not to take it personally nor regret it. "Don’t second-guess. It is what it is. Be present and you'll be fine ... And I would say I'd like to buy this guy two beers."

Media notability 

Time magazine rated the incident as its second Top Ten Travel Moments of 2010. ABC affiliate television station WFTS-TV put it in the top 10 most captivating stories of 2010. The New York Daily News listed it as no. 8 of the 15 news stories of the year.  The New York Times identified it as no 6 of the things New Yorkers talked about in 2010. The City Room section of the New York Times reported it was the story of its 2nd, 3rd, and 9th most viewed posts in 2010. The Week rated it amongst the 7 most overplayed media stories of 2010.

Time magazine in its List for  2010, put Steven Slater both as the top Fleeting Celebrity of the Year and separately, the top person with 15 minutes of fame.  The Dallas Morning News named him Traveler of the Year. Steven Slater was included in ABC's Good Morning America "A year in review" as one of its top stories of 2010. Joy Behar on CNN speaking to Steven Slater on a panel discussion of the top stories of 2010 said "You're one of the biggest news makers of 2010 believe it or not."

NBC sitcom 30 Rock references the incident in the fourth episode of its sixth season ("The Ballad of Kenneth Parcell") in a mock-Garry Marshall inspired trailer, captioning a photo of Steven Slater with the words "That Flight Attendant That Went Crazy".

On their joint EP Buddies, Frank Turner and Jon Snodgrass recorded a song in tribute to Slater, "The Ballad of Steve". Turner ends the song by saying "I think Steve'll like that."

See also 

List of air rage incidents
Workplace stress
Air rage

References

External links 
 "Sometimes the weird news is about us." – BlueTales (JetBlue blog)

Flight attendants
JetBlue accidents and incidents
2010 in New York City
August 2010 events in the United States